Georg Karl Brauer (born 11. April 1908 in Bochum, died 26. February 2001 in Freiburg im Breisgau) was a German chemist.

Life 
Brauer was the son of the chemist Eberhard Brauer and Elisabeth Brauer, a daughter of Wilhelm Ostwald. From 1926 to 1932, Brauer studied in Leipzig and Freiburg. He received his doctorate under supervision of Eduard Zintl in Freiburg in 1933. In 1941, he received is habilitation at the TH Darmstadt. In 1946, he became an extraordinary professor in Freiburg. From 1959 to 1976, he was a full professor. Starting in 1976, he was a emeritus professor.

Research 
Brauer's research included the chemistry and crystal chemistry of intermetallic compounds and alloys. He investigated binary systems of transition metals, in particular of oxides, nitrides, carbides, and hydrides of niobium, tantalum, and vanadium. His research also focused on oxides of rare-earth metals. Many new compounds and several new structure types (Li3N, Li3Bi, Al3Zr, ThSi2, NbO) were discovered during this research.

Awards 
In 1971, he received the Lebeau medal.

Publications 
Georg Brauer was the editor of the "Handbook of Preparative Inorganic Chemistry".

References 

20th-century German chemists
1908 births
2001 deaths
Scientists from Freiburg im Breisgau
University of Freiburg alumni
Technische Universität Darmstadt alumni
Academic staff of Technische Universität Darmstadt
Rare earth scientists